John Philip Abizaid (born April 1, 1951) is a retired United States Army general and former United States Central Command (CENTCOM) commander who served as the United States Ambassador to Saudi Arabia from 2019 to 2021.

Abizaid retired after 34 years of service. As of 2007, Abizaid is employed as a fellow of the Hoover Institution at Stanford University. He assumed the Distinguished Chair of the Combating Terrorism Center at West Point in December 2007. Abizaid was appointed to the board of directors of RPM International on January 24, 2008, and also sits on the board of directors of the Defense Ventures Group. In 2008 he was selected as a Montgomery Fellow at Dartmouth College.

On November 13, 2018, he was nominated as the United States Ambassador to Saudi Arabia. He was confirmed by the United States Senate as Ambassador on April 10, 2019 and sworn in on April 30, 2019. Abizaid formally presented his credentials to King Salman on June 16, 2019. He resigned on January 20, 2021. He now serves as Senior Advisor at Albright Stonebridge Group.

Early life and education
A Lebanese American, Abizaid was born in northern California in 1951, and raised in Coleville, California. Abizaid was a  1969 graduate of Coleville High School.  His grandparents had immigrated to California from Lebanon during the late 19th century. He was raised Roman Catholic. His father, a Navy machinist in World War II, raised him after Abizaid's mother died of cancer.

Abizaid's military education includes the United States Military Academy (USMA) at West Point, New York (Class of 1973); Infantry Officer Basic and Advanced courses, Armed Forces Staff College, and a U.S. Army War College Senior Fellowship at the Hoover Institution, Stanford University.

In his civilian studies, he earned a Master of Arts degree in Middle Eastern Studies at Harvard University, and was an Olmsted Scholar at the University of Jordan in Amman, Jordan. Abizaid greatly impressed his teachers at Harvard University. Nadav Safran, the director of the Harvard Center for Middle Eastern Studies kept Abizaid's 100-page paper on defense policy for Saudi Arabia, the only paper of a master's student he has kept, saying, "It was absolutely the best seminar paper I ever got in my 30-plus years at Harvard."

Career

Abizaid was commissioned a second lieutenant of infantry upon graduation from the United States Military Academy at West Point, New York, Class of June 1973. He started his career with the 504th Parachute Infantry Regiment, 82nd Airborne Division at Fort Bragg, North Carolina, where he served as a rifle and scout platoon leader. He commanded companies in the 2nd and 1st Ranger Battalions, leading a Ranger Rifle Company during the invasion of Grenada. In 1983, he jumped from an MC-130 onto a landing strip in Grenada and ordered one of his Rangers to drive a bulldozer like a tank toward Cuban troops as he advanced behind it—a move highlighted in the 1986 Clint Eastwood film, Heartbreak Ridge.

Abizaid commanded the 3rd Battalion, 325th Airborne Regiment combat Team in Vicenza, Italy, during the Persian Gulf War and deployed with the battalion in Northern Iraq to provide a safe haven for the Kurds.

His brigade command was the 504th Parachute Infantry Regiment of the 82nd Airborne Division. He served as the Assistant Division Commander, 1st Armored Division, in Bosnia-Herzegovina. Following that tour, he served as the 66th Commandant at the United States Military Academy at West Point. At West Point, he reined in hazing rituals and revamped the curriculum. Later, he took command of the 1st Infantry Division, the "Big Red One," in Würzburg, Germany, from David L. Grange, which provided the first U.S. ground forces into Kosovo. He served as the Deputy Commander (Forward), Combined Forces Command, U.S. Central Command during Operation Iraqi Freedom.

Staff assignments include a tour with the United Nations as Operations Officer (G-3) for Observer Group Lebanon and a tour in the Office of the Chief of Staff of the U.S. Army. European staff tours include assignments in both the Southern European Task Force and Headquarters, U.S. Army Europe. Abizaid also served as Executive Assistant to the Chairman of the Joint Chiefs of Staff, Director of Strategic Plans and Policy (J-5) on the Joint Staff and Director of the Joint Staff.

Following the Iraq War and the overthrow of Saddam Hussein, he assumed command of Central Command from General Tommy Franks.

On December 20, 2006, it was announced that Abizaid would step down from his position and retire in March 2007. He had planned to retire earlier, but stayed at the urging of Donald Rumsfeld. On March 16, 2007, Abizaid transferred command to Admiral William J. Fallon, after serving longer as Commander, U.S. Central Command than any of his predecessors.

On September 8, 2016, Abizaid was appointed advisor to Ukrainian Defense Minister Stepan Poltorak by Secretary of Defense Ash Carter.

On November 13, 2018, he was nominated as the U.S. Ambassador to Saudi Arabia. He was confirmed by the United States Senate as Ambassador on April 10, 2019 and sworn in on April 30, 2019. Abizaid formally presented his credentials to King Salman on June 16, 2019.

Personal life
Abizaid is married and has three children, including Christine Abizaid. He learned Arabic in the military.

Global War on Terrorism speech
In November 2005, Abizaid gave a speech on the Global War on Terrorism at the Naval War College.

2006–2007 comments on Iraq

On August 3, 2006, Abizaid, in testimony before the Senate Armed Services Committee, said the following about the situation on the ground in Iraq: "I believe that the sectarian violence is probably as bad as I've seen it, in Baghdad in particular, and that if not stopped, it is possible that Iraq could move towards civil war." He also testified, "I'm optimistic that that slide [toward civil war] can be prevented".

Bob Woodward on Abizaid and Murtha

In State of Denial: Bush at War, Part III (as excerpted in Newsweek magazine), Bob Woodward of The Washington Post wrote that on March 16, 2006 Abizaid was in Washington to testify before the Senate Armed Services Committee. "He painted a careful but upbeat picture of the situation in Iraq." Subsequently, "he went over to see Congressman John Murtha (D-Pa), the 73-year old veteran Marine who had introduced a resolution the previous November calling for the redeployment of troops from Iraq as soon as practicable." Abizaid said he wanted to speak frankly, and "according to Murtha, Abizaid raised his hand for emphasis and held his thumb and forefinger a quarter of an inch from each other and said, "We're that far apart."

On October 1, 2006, an interview of Woodward by CBS reporter Mike Wallace was broadcast on the television show 60 Minutes. Wallace mentioned the Murtha-Abizaid conversation. Wallace asked Woodward to confirm that Murtha had told him of this tale of meeting with Abizaid; Woodward nodded his head in assent and said yes.

Iran's nuclear program
In remarks at the Center for Strategic and International Studies reported on September 17, 2007, Abizaid stated, "We need to press the international community as hard as we possibly can, and the Iranians, to cease and desist on the development of a nuclear weapon and we should not preclude any option that we may have to deal with it." He also said, "I believe that we have the power to deter Iran, should it become nuclear."

"There are ways to live with a nuclear Iran," Abizaid said, "Let's face it, we lived with a nuclear Soviet Union, we've lived with a nuclear China, and we're living with (other) nuclear powers as well."

Awards and decorations
Abizaid has been decorated for service, to include:

International decorations
  Honorary Officer of the Order of Australia
  Gold Cross of Honour of the Bundeswehr (Ehrenkreuz der Bundeswehr in Gold)

References

Further reading

External links

 Interview with GEN(R) John Abizaid discussing September 11, 2001 on the West Point Center for Oral History; see also www.westpointcoh.org
 Interview with GEN(R) John Abizaid about his career on the West Point Center for Oral History; see also www.westpointcoh.org
 "West Point Association of Graduates Distinguished Graduate Award Recipient 2009"
 "Newsmaker: General John Abizaid" , PBS, March 4, 2004.
 John Abizaid bio at the Preventive Defense Project.
 "Centcom's Renaissance Man", The Washington Post
 Paul de la Garza, "In Search of Ground Truth: CentCom chief Gen. John Abizaid crisscrosses the front lines to get intel on the war on terror....", St. Petersburg Times, September 3, 2006
 "Abizaid plans to leave post in March" The Boston Globe, December 20, 2006
 New Hand at Helm at Centcom
 

|-

1951 births
Ambassadors of the United States to Saudi Arabia
American people of Lebanese descent
Catholics from California
Commandants of the Corps of Cadets of the United States Military Academy
Harvard Graduate School of Arts and Sciences alumni
Honorary Officers of the Order of Australia
Living people
Middle Eastern Christians
Recipients of the Distinguished Service Medal (US Army)
Recipients of the Badge of Honour of the Bundeswehr
Recipients of the Defense Distinguished Service Medal
Recipients of the Defense Superior Service Medal
Recipients of the Legion of Merit
Recipients of the Order of Saint Maurice
United States Army generals
United States Army Rangers
United States Military Academy alumni
University of Jordan alumni
Recipients of the Humanitarian Service Medal